Janine Claire Belton (born 23 November 1979), is an English former competitive swimmer who represented Great Britain at the Olympics and FINA world championships, and competed for England at the Commonwealth Games, during the 1990s and early 2000s. 

Belton is best known for winning a gold medal at the 2001 FINA World Championships as a member of the first-place British women's 4×200-metre freestyle relay team alongside Nicola Jackson, Karen Legg and Karen Pickering.

She represented Great Britain at the 1996 and 2000 Olympic Games, in both instances as a member of the British women's 4×200-metre freestyle relay squad.  In 1996 she swam in the preliminary heats of the 4x200-metre relay; in 2000 she swam in the heats and event final as a member of Britain's sixth-place team.  At the 2002 Commonwealth Games in Manchester, she represented England while competing in the women's 200-metre freestyle.

At the British short course national championships in 2001, Karen Legg, Belton, Nicola Jackson and Karen Pickering set a new short course world record of 7:47.14 in the 4x200-metre freestyle relay.

See also
 World record progression 4 × 200 metres freestyle relay

References

Living people
1979 births
English female swimmers
English female freestyle swimmers
Olympic swimmers of Great Britain
Swimmers at the 1996 Summer Olympics
Swimmers at the 2000 Summer Olympics
Swimmers at the 2002 Commonwealth Games
World Aquatics Championships medalists in swimming
Commonwealth Games competitors for England
20th-century English women
21st-century English women